Stade Ange Casanova is a football stadium in Ajaccio, Corsica, France and was the home stadium of Gazélec Football Club Olympique Ajaccio. Its capacity is 8,000 people.

Stade Mezzavia was built in 1961. It was renamed Stade Ange Casanova on 16 July 1994 in memory of Ange Casanova, ex-director of Gazélec. Before 1961, the club played at the Stade Miniconi.

As of the 15th of February 2023. The stadium has ceased to host professional football matches, due to the liquidation of its ex-tenants, Gazélec Ajaccio.

References

Gazélec Ajaccio
Ange Casanova
Sports venues in Corse-du-Sud
Sports venues completed in 1961